The French hill climb championship, or Championnat de France de la Montagne started in 1967 and rapidly became one of the continent's most competitive national series.  For much of its history, the leading cars have been from Formula 2 (later Formula 3000 from 1985) or 2-litre sports cars.  Some F1 cars were seen in the 1960s and occasionally in the 1970s (for example Daniel Rouveyran's March 721G in 1973) and Hervé Bayard also tried a Formula 5000 car in the early 1970s.

Champions

References

External links
Cote Passion - history of the Championnat de France de la Montagne
Equipe Régal - Site officiel 
Chevallier-Competition.com
Bernard Chambérod's site

Hillclimbing series
Auto racing series in France